Duke Francis Julius of Sachsen-Lauenburg (13 September 1584 in Ratzeburg – 8 October 1634 in Vienna) was a prince of Saxe-Lauenburg.

Life 
Julius Francis was the eldest son of Francis II, Duke of Saxe-Lauenburg from his second marriage, Maria of Brunswick-Lüneburg, the daughter of Julius, Duke of Brunswick-Wolfenbüttel.  His education and training, like that of his siblings, was patchy and superficial.  His older half-brother Augustus succeeded his father in 1619 as Duke of Saxe-Lauenburg.  On 4 October 1619 he signed a contract with his brothers.  He acknowledged his brother as the ruling Duke and in return he received the Anker Manor as a residence and an annual pension of 2500 thalers.

Julius Francis served as a chamberlain at the imperial court in Vienna and was entrusted with several diplomatic missions by Emperor Ferdinand II.

When his brother Augustus occupied Amt Neuhaus, which was Francis Julius's mother's wittum, Francis Julius objected vehemently.  The dispute lasted until Francis Julius's death.  Francis Julius also initiated, on behalf of his family, a case before the Aulic Council against the city of Hamburg, about the ownership of the district and castle of Ritzebüttel (today's Cuxhaven).

Francis Julius died in 1634 in Vienna. He probably died of the plague.  Since he had outlived his children and did not have an heir, Anker Manor fell back to Augustus.

Marriage and children 
On 14 May 1620, Francis Julius married Agnes (1592–1629), the daughter of Frederick I, Duke of Württemberg. They had seven children, who all died young:
 Maria Franciska (1621–1621)
 Maria Sibylla (1622–1623)
 Frederick Francis (1623–1625)
 Julius Francis (1624–1625)
 Johanna Juliane (1626–1626)
 Francis Ferdinand (1628–1629)
 Francis Louis (1629–1629)

Ancestry

References 
 Johann Samuel Ersch: Allgemeine Encyclopädie der Wissenschaften und Künste in alphabetischer Folge, vol. 48, J. f. Gleditsch, 1848, p. 97 ff, Online

House of Ascania
1584 births
1634 deaths
17th-century German people
Dukes of Saxe-Lauenburg
Sons of monarchs